The 1990 Tour de France was the 77th edition of the Tour de France, one of cycling's Grand Tours. It took place between 30 June and 22 July 1990. The  race consisted of 21 stages and a prologue. American Greg LeMond repeated his 1989 victory in the general classification, ahead of Claudio Chiappucci and Erik Breukink in second and third place respectively.

The Tour started with a prologue time trial at the Futuroscope theme park, won by Thierry Marie. On the first stage, a four-rider group escaped and gained more than ten minutes on the rest of the field. Steve Bauer became the new leader of the race, but faltered in the Alps as Ronan Pensec, also from the escape group, took over the race lead. Two days later, during a mountain time trial to Villard-de-Lans, the lead passed to Claudio Chiappucci, who had been in the same group as well. Chiappucci fought to hang on to his advantage over defending champion LeMond, but was overtaken in the final time trial on the penultimate stage. It was LeMond's third Tour victory, a feat he achieved without winning an individual stage.

The points classification was won by Olaf Ludwig, while the mountains classification was won by Thierry Claveyrolat. Gilles Delion was the best young rider, while Eduardo Chozas was awarded the super-combativity prize. , the team of race winner LeMond, won the team classification.

The 1990 race was the first edition in which riders from Eastern Bloc nations participated. Ludwig became the first rider from East Germany and Dimitri Konyshev was the first Soviet rider to win a stage at the Tour.

Teams

The 1990 Tour had a starting field of 22 teams of 9 cyclists. Of those 22, 16 teams qualified based on the FICP team rankings, while six teams were given wildcards. Notable teams who failed to qualify and were not invited were BH–Amaya Seguros and Café de Colombia with Luis Herrera, a double former winner of the mountains classification.

The largest numbers of riders from a nation came from France (35), with the next largest coming from Belgium (27), Spain (25), Italy (22), Netherlands (19), Colombia (14) and Switzerland (13). For the first time, riders from the Eastern Bloc competed in the Tour, ten in total, enabled by the changing political climate brought about by the revolutions in the Eastern Bloc countries. While several riders from Warsaw Pact nations had transferred to established Western teams, the  team was made up of exclusively Soviet cyclists.

Of the 198 cyclists starting the race, 58 were riding the Tour de France for the first time. The average age of riders in the race was 27.77 years, ranging from the 21-year-old Antonio Miguel Díaz to the 35-year-old Gilbert Duclos-Lassalle. The  cyclists had the youngest average age while the riders on  had the oldest.

The teams entering the race were:

Qualified teams

 
 
 
 
 
 
 
 
 
 
 
 
 
 
 
 

Invited teams

Pre-race favourites

In the lead up to the Tour, the main contenders for the general classification were Greg LeMond, Laurent Fignon, Pedro Delgado, and Stephen Roche. All four were former Tour winners. They were the preeminent stage race specialists, with each one focusing their season around the Tour.

The leading favourite was two-time Tour winner LeMond, who returned to defend his title. After winning the Tour in 1989 and the World Championship road race, LeMond had not taken another victory. He had finished Paris–Nice more than eight minutes behind the winner and struggled at the Giro d'Italia, where he placed 105th. He was considered overweight due to lack of training and had been suffering from mononucleosis. Encouraging signs came during the Tour de Suisse, just weeks before the start of the Tour de France, where he finished tenth. LeMond did not consider himself a favourite for victory going into the race, but declared that he would be disappointed should he not finish on the podium. For the first time at a Tour, LeMond had the support of his whole team, including Robert Millar, who had won the Critérium du Dauphiné Libéré and placed second at the Tour de Suisse just prior to the start of the Tour.

The sport newspaper L'Équipe was expecting a close battle between LeMond and Fignon, who had finished in second place in 1989, only eight seconds behind LeMond. Fignon had previously won the Tour in 1983 and 1984. A crash on stage 5 of the Giro had forced Fignon to abandon the race he had won in 1989. He returned to racing at the Route du Sud and later competed in the Tour de Luxembourg as preparation for the Tour de France and had apparently overcome his injuries. Writing in his autobiography, Fignon later admitted that his crashes and poor results earlier in the season had left him "a tired man, physically and mentally" and that he entered the Tour with "few illusions about what was coming". Fignon's squad was not seen as the strongest, but they were dedicated to him and managed by Cyrille Guimard, who had led multiple riders to Tour victories.

Delgado, the winner of the 1988 Tour, was in good form after placing second at the Vuelta a España earlier in the year. He was part of the strong  team, with Miguel Induráin to help him in the mountains. Roche, winner of the 1987 edition, was on the start line, but still troubled by recurring knee pain. His best result of the season had been a second place behind Induráin at Paris–Nice.

Erik Breukink was among several other riders named as favourites. Sean Kelly, was the record winner of the points classification and appeared in good form, having just won the Tour de Suisse, but was thought to be working for Breukink. Spanish newspaper El País considered Delgado to be the top favourite, but also named Fignon, LeMond, and Gianni Bugno, who had won the Giro earlier that year, as potential winners. Mundo Deportivo also named Charly Mottet among the favourites. His best result that season had been a second place behind Bugno at the Giro. Also on the start line was Marco Giovannetti, winner of the Vuelta and third at the Giro. According to cycling journalist Geoffrey Nicholson, his ability to perform in another three-week Grand Tour was doubted from the start, and it was agreed that he only participated to ensure a wildcard entry for his team, Seur.

Gert-Jan Theunisse, fourth the previous year and winner of the mountains classification, did not start due to two positive doping tests earlier in the season.

Route and stages

The 1990 Tour de France started on 30 June, and had two rest days. The race had its Grand Départ (opening stages) in and around the Futuroscope theme park, whose owners paid around $1 million for the right to host the beginning of the race. After two stages, both held on the same day, also at Futuroscope, the Tour took a clockwise route around France. The race traveled north towards the English Channel and then east to Rouen. A plane transfer on the first rest day brought the field to Sarrebourg on the border to Germany before the race turned south towards the Alps. On the second rest day, the Tour remained in Villard-de-Lans. The race then turned south-west to the Pyrenees before turning north again towards Paris, ending with the ceremonial Champs-Élysées stage.

, this is the last time that a Tour de France stage exceeded . It was among five hors catégorie (beyond category) rated climbs in the race.

Race overview

Grand Départ at Futuroscope

The prologue at Futuroscope was won by Thierry Marie, a specialist in the discipline, who had also taken the first yellow jersey in 1986. He recorded a time of 7:49 minutes, four seconds faster than LeMond and Raúl Alcalá in second and third respectively. Fignon finished in 15th place, 19 seconds slower than Marie, with Delgado in 26th place losing a further five seconds.

The first and the second stage were run on the same day, the second stage in the team time trial format. After just  of the first stage, Claudio Chiappucci broke away from the field. He had won the mountain classifications at both Paris–Nice and the Giro d'Italia that year and aimed at getting the jersey early on in the Tour as well. He was joined in his breakaway by Steve Bauer, Ronan Pensec, and Frans Maassen. With the team time trial looming in the afternoon, the field allowed the break to draw out an advantage. Additionally, a blockade by sheep farmers delayed the peloton, the main field, and caused several crashes, including one involving Delgado. Chiappucci took the points at the mountain sprints, ensuring that he would wear the polka-dot jersey for the next stage.  from the finish, the lead was still at 13 minutes. As Maassen took the stage victory ahead of Pensec, the four-man group still retained an advantage of 10:35 minutes over the rest of the field. Bauer took the lead in the general classification, having posted the fastest time in the prologue. Later in the day the team time trial was won by the  team. Seven seconds slower,  finished in second place. Fignon's Castorama squad finished fifth, 33 seconds slower than Panasonic, but 20 seconds faster than LeMond's Z team, who were seventh. In between them were 7-Eleven with yellow-jersey wearer Bauer, who retained his overall lead.

North-west
Stage 3 began with an early attack by Stephen Roche, who was followed by LeMond. This prompted the teams of Bauer and Delgado to give chase, and the field was back together after . At , Fignon punctured a tyre, but he was able to rejoin shortly after. After  the race was interrupted by another protest from sheep farmers, who had four fallen trees ready to block the road. The organisers received news of the blockade early and used a local youth on a motorcycle to lead the field through backstreets around the protest. With  of the stage remaining, Roque de la Cruz became the first rider to abandon the Tour, following a crash which also brought down Fignon, who again had to chase in order to regain contact with the main group. At this point, Moreno Argentin had already attacked and was building an advantage on the rest of the field. He also crashed, but was able to remount and continued to win the stage by 2:29 minutes. In the peloton, Christophe Lavainne won the sprint and raised in arms in celebration, unaware that Argentin had already finished. Through obtaining bonuses at intermediate sprints, Olaf Ludwig took the lead in the points classification.

Stage 4 saw Gilles Delion attack while Gérard Rué was greeting his family in his home town. Delion was caught by Edwig Van Hooydonck, but both were quickly brought back by the Panasonic team, who were working for Ludwig to win the stage. Next, Søren Lilholt attacked and was later joined by Kurt Steinmann and William Pulido. Bugno, Delgado, and Fignon were caught out behind the incident. While Delgado and Bugno lost 21 seconds in the end, Fignon lost 44 seconds to his rivals in the general classification. At the finish, which for the first time was at Mont Saint-Michel, Ludwig opened his sprint too early, allowing Johan Museeuw, who won the stage, and Guido Bontempi to pass him. Robert Millar was caught up in a crash, losing nine minutes, effectively ruling him out from competing in the general classification.

As the peloton sped up to catch an early breakaway, Fignon drifted backwards and ultimately abandoned the Tour at the first feeding station. After the breakaway was caught, Gerrit Solleveld attacked and stayed away, winning the stage 4:27 minutes ahead of Museeuw, who won the sprint of the field. Argentin, still bruised from his fall on stage 3 and another on stage 5, abandoned after the rest day.

North-east and Jura
During stage 6, Chiappucci sustained two punctured tyres, both times at the start of the two ascents of the day. This meant that he was unable to defend his lead in the mountain classification, and the polka-dot jersey went to Dimitri Konyshev, who became the first Soviet rider to wear a leader's jersey at the Tour de France. Bugno attacked shortly behind the feed zone, leading to a number of reactions from the field, but after , the peloton was back together. A small group, containing Museeuw and Viatcheslav Ekimov, among others, leapt away  from the finish.

Stage 7's individual time trial was run in changing conditions. While the early starters competed in the dry, the later riders rode on wet roads. Miguel Induráin set an early fast time and held the lead for most of the day. Greg LeMond started fast, but faded later on to eventually finish fifth. Alcalá, also a late starter, was the fastest rider, 1:24 ahead of Induráin's time. Bugno was third, ahead of Delgado. Of the riders from the stage-1 breakaway, Pensec was fastest, in seventh place. He remained second overall however, 17 seconds behind Bauer, who finished the time trial in 14th place, one place ahead of Chiappucci. Stephen Roche lost 3 minutes in the last   alone, suffering from hyperglycemia. Likewise, Charly Mottet lost significant time, finishing 3½ minutes behind Alcalá. Alcalá moved into fifth place overall, still more than seven minutes behind Bauer.

Early during stage 8, a four-man breakaway went ahead, but was quickly caught. The speed of the peloton saw Álvaro Pino, winner of the 1986 Vuelta a España, abandon the race. Michel Vermote then attacked after  on a section of cobbled road. In the final , a group of 13 riders escaped, including Ludwig and Museeuw. Ludwig judged his sprint well this time and beat Museeuw for the win. It was the first stage victory by a rider from East Germany and from the Eastern Bloc in the Tour de France.

Stage 9 headed into Switzerland and was the last day that featured rain, before temperatures began to rise significantly. An escape group went clear after , which included Frans Maassen, who was still in fourth place overall. This prompted Bauer's  team to chase, bringing the group back after . At the Côte des Rousses, the first second-category climb of the Tour, Massimo Ghirotto and Eduardo Chozas were out in front alone. On the same climb, Jean-François Bernard, third in the 1987 Tour, fell behind and out of contention. The two escapees held on to their advantage into the finish town of Geneva, where Ghirotto edged out Chozas in the sprint.

Alps

Stage 10 was the first real test in the mountains, with a summit finish at the Saint Gervais-les-Baines ski resort on Mont Blanc. On the first climb of the day, the Col de la Colombière, Omar Hernández attacked, followed by Thierry Claveyrolat. As Hernández slowed, Claveyrolat overtook him and continued on alone, riding the rest of the stage on his own to take victory. He also took the lead in the mountains classification, which he would retain for the rest of the Tour. Behind him, Delgado attacked on the final climb with  remaining, putting Bauer into difficulty. Pensec, who celebrated his 27th birthday, stayed with the other favourites and took over the yellow jersey. He led Chiappucci by 50 seconds, while Bauer fell back to third, 1:21 minutes adrift. Among the pre-race favourites, LeMond lost 19 seconds to Delgado, but finished with Bugno, Induráin, Alcalá, and Breukink. Bugno received a 20-second penalty for accepting food late in the stage, when it was no longer allowed.

On stage 11, the course ended with the final ascent to Alpe d'Huez, considered one of the most iconic climbs in cycling. Two mountains had to be crossed beforehand: the Col de la Madeleine and the Col du Glandon. Claveyrolat attacked again, early on during the ascent of the Madeleine, and gathered the mountain points at the summit. Mottet started to drop behind the group of favourites on the Madeleine, while Bernard retired. On the descent, Induráin got away but was overtaken by Claveyrolat on the climb of the Glandon. In between the climbs, at the feed zone, LeMond was involved in a crash, but able to carry on. On the Glandon, Delgado accelerated and only LeMond and Bugno were able to follow. Together they caught Induráin, who set the pace in the group through the ensuing valley and ensured that they reached Claveyrolat by the foot of the final climb. Shortly after the group began the ascent, Delgado attacked, with LeMond and Bugno following. As the pace slowed, Claveyrolat, Parra, and Breukink managed to catch back up.  from the finish, Delgado lost contact with Bugno, who accelerated and took LeMond, Breukink, Claveyrolat, and Parra with him. It were Bugno and LeMond who were fastest along the finishing straight, with Bugno coming out on top to win the stage. Breukink finished third, one second behind LeMond in second place. Meanwhile, Millar paced Pensec up the climb, who finished 48 seconds behind Bugno and retained the race lead. Delgado lost forty seconds, while Induráin, exhausted by his work on the flat, lost 12 minutes on Alpe d'Huez, falling from contention. Chiappucci finished 1:48 minutes behind Bugno. This left Pensec first overall, 1:28 minutes ahead of Chiappucci, with LeMond up to third, but still 9:04 minutes behind his teammate. Alcalá had lost 5:41 minutes on Bugno, and therefore dropped to eighth place overall.

Pensec lost the yellow jersey the following day, at stage 12's mountain time trial to Villard-de-Lans. He finished almost three minutes slower than Chiappucci, who took the overall lead, now 1:17 minutes ahead of Pensec. The winner of the stage was Breukink, with Delgado in second place, thirty seconds slower. Delgado performed well despite problems with his rear wheel which forced him to change bikes within the last kilometre. Induráin produced another good performance, finishing third at 43 seconds. LeMond suffered during the second half of the climb and finished fifth, dropping to fourth in the general classification behind Breukink. Breukink was 6:55 minutes behind new leader Chiappucci, with LeMond a further 32 seconds adrift. In fifth place followed Delgado, now 9:02 minutes in arrears.

Massif Central transition
Stage 13 to Saint-Étienne took place on Bastille Day, the French national holiday. Phil Anderson led down the descent from Villard-de-Lans, followed by Mottet, which prompted a reaction by the main field and both riders were brought back after . Chiappucci, without the help of strong teammates, had to lead the chase himself, bringing back the breakaway  from the finish. Just as the contact was made, a group of ten riders attacked, among them LeMond, Breukink, Induráin, and Andrew Hampsten. At the foot of the last climb of the day, the Col de la Croix de Chaubouret, Delgado led a counter-attack with Bugno and Marino Lejarreta. Although Induráin dropped back to aid Delgado's chase, the LeMond group maintained an advantage of thirty seconds until the finish. Here, Chozas won the sprint from Breukink and Hampsten. A group containing Alcalá, Roche, and Parra lost 3:09 minutes. Chiappucci came in with the peloton, losing 4:53 minutes. Pensec dropped from second to fourth in the general classification, arriving 7:47 minutes after Chozas. Chiappucci now led the race by 2:02 minutes over Breukink, with LeMond third at 2:34.

During the early part of stage 14, Jean-Claude Colotti was highly active. After , 17 more riders caught up to him. Jean-Claude Bagot then attacked from the lead group with  left to ride, but he was caught by the peloton on the final ascent to Causse Noir near Millau. At the finish, Lejarreta took victory, but did not raise his arms in celebration, thinking someone had finished ahead of him. 24 seconds later followed Induráin and Bugno. LeMond and Breukink finished together, another ten seconds behind. Chiappucci could only finish 13th, losing 13 seconds to LeMond and Breukink, whom he now led by 1:49 minutes in the general classification. Lejarreta moved up to seventh place overall.

Stage 15 was a transition stage, the last before the Pyrenees, and featured only smaller climbs. Adri van der Poel launched an attack that resulted in an eleven-rider strong breakaway. This group was almost caught after  of racing, but while three riders dropped back into the peloton, eight remained in front and were later joined by several others, who bridged across, including Roche, Mottet, Claveyrolet, and Chozas. The now 19-rider strong group increased their advantage to up to eight minutes, which would have moved Chozas up to fourth place overall. Eventually, Mottet attacked from the lead group and held on to the finish, winning the stage by 2:02 minutes ahead of Giuseppe Calcaterra. When the peloton reached the finish, a split occurred in the field, which gained Chiappucci three seconds on his rivals in the general classification.

Pyrenees

In very hot weather, stage 16 saw the last mountain-top finish of the Tour. In the second half of the stage, the summits of the Col d'Aspin, the Col du Tourmalet, and the final ascent to Luz Ardiden had to be climbed. On the early slopes of the Aspin, Chiappucci followed an attack by Jörg Müller and found himself in a lead group, building an advantage on his rivals. At the summit, he led the group across 45 seconds ahead of the main field. As  began to chase for LeMond on the approach to the Tourmalet, the gap began to decrease. In the front group, Miguel Ángel Martínez Torres attacked and got away on his own. Behind, in the group of favourites, Breukink experienced a jour sans, a day without energy, and began to fall behind.

On the ascent to Luz Ardiden, Chiappucci defiantly set the pace at the front of the group. However, with  left to race, an attack by Parra was too much and while LeMond, Induráin, and Lejarreta followed, Chiappucci fell behind. LeMond moved to the front and set a high pace as Parra was quickly dropped. Lejarreta was dropped shortly thereafter. For the duration of the climb LeMond worked at the front setting the pace to increase his time gains essentially winning the Tour on this attack. Induráin overtook him as they approached the summit and coming around the final turn he quickly turned his head around to verify LeMond was not going to challenge him for the stage win and began clapping his hands in celebration as he claimed the victory six seconds ahead of LeMond. Chiappucci eventually lost 2:19 minutes, which reduced his advantage over LeMond, who was now second overall, to just five seconds. Breukink lost 4:16 minutes, dropping to fourth behind Delgado, who finished 1:32 behind teammate Induráin.

The next day's route from Lourdes to Pau was considered easier than the day before, with the two major climbs, the hors categorie Col d'Aubisque and the first-category Col de Marie-Blanque both coming during the first half of the stage. Early on, a 19-man breakaway formed, including riders such as Bauer, Konyshev, Acácio da Silva, Johan Bruyneel, as well as LeMond's teammates Gilbert Duclos-Lassalle and Atle Kvålsvoll. On the Aubisque, Óscar Vargas attacked and reached the summit ahead of the lead group. On the Marie-Blanque, the situation had changed and Delgado's  teammate Dominique Arnaud led solo over the top, 10:20 minutes ahead of the peloton. With the group of favourites, including yellow jersey Chiappucci, leaving him behind, LeMond had to wait 1:20 minutes for his team car to arrive. The new wheel given to him was rubbing on the frame, which meant that LeMond had to dismount again and change bikes. By now, he crossed the top of the Marie-Blanque 1:27 minutes behind Chiappucci. Teammates Éric Boyer and Jérôme Simon joined him, but had problems keeping up with LeMond during the descent, which he took flat out and without braking in order to catch back up. Duclos-Lassalle and Kvålsvoll were ordered by the team to stop and drop back from the lead group to aid LeMond in reaching Chiappucci after  of chasing.

Up ahead, Bruyneel attacked from the lead group and was followed by Konyshev, who got the better of the Belgian in the two-man sprint for the stage victory. It was the first time that a Soviet or Russian rider had won a stage of the Tour de France. LeMond accused Chiappucci of violating the unwritten rules of the sport, where traditionally a leader is not attacked if they have a crash or mechanical difficulties. Indeed, the  team had even called back da Silva from the breakaway to assist Chiappucci in extending his advantage.

Final stages

Stage 18 led the Tour to Bordeaux, a finishing town traditionally favouring the sprinters. The field started the day slowly and a real attack did not materialise until Anderson broke away after . He was soon joined by six other riders, but the break was caught  later. With  to go, a more serious move formed, with 19 riders, which included LeMond, Chiappucci, Breukink, Bugno, and Alcalá. At  remaining, Breukink, Bugno, and the latter's teammate, Roberto Gusmeroli, attacked from the leading group. The other 16 riders fell behind and were soon caught by the main field. At the finish, Gusmeroli led out Bugno, who easily beat Breukink to become the first rider to win two stages at that year's Tour. Breukink meanwhile gained 18 seconds on Delgado and therefore moved into third place overall.

The next day, the peloton equally made a slow start to the stage, with the first real attack coming more than halfway into the race, after . Fifteen riders broke away from the field, including van der Poel, Pensec, Tony Rominger, and Bontempi. After , the group had swollen to 24 riders. Bontempi, formerly a very good sprinter, but now considered past his prime, attacked from the breakaway and went solo to the finish, where he won the stage, 1:28 minutes ahead of Dag Otto Lauritzen. During the stage, the Tour circumvented another blockade by sheep farmers, which only managed to hold up the press caravan, but did not influence the race.

The individual time trial on the penultimate day, stage 20, became decisive for the race's outcome. LeMond easily made up the five seconds needed to overcome Chiappucci at the top of the standings. He finished fifth on the day, 2:21 minutes ahead of Chiappucci, who was 17th. Erik Breukink claimed the stage victory, 28 seconds ahead of his teammate Alcalá, with Lejarreta in third, ahead of Induráin. Delgado was eighth fastest, 2:21 behind Breukink, which put him in fourth place overall and left him just short of making the final podium for the fourth year in a row. Through their strong performances, Alcalá and Induráin returned to the top-ten riders in the general classification.

The final stage to Paris was by tradition a ceremonial one, apart for the final section on the Champs-Élysées, when the stage victory is decided. Stephen Hodge tried to break away in Paris, in an attempt to make up the 16 seconds his  team trailed  in the team classification, but he was not successful. The stage came down to a sprint, won by Museeuw, ahead of Adriano Baffi and Olaf Ludwig. It was the only time during that year's Tour that a stage finished in a mass sprint. LeMond crossed the finish line safely in the middle of the field, his arms aloft in celebration at his third overall Tour victory. 156 riders out of 198 starters reached the finish in Paris. In last place, the lanterne rouge, was Rodolfo Massi.

LeMond had won the Tour without taking a stage win. Since the end of World War II, only Roger Walkowiak (1956), Gastone Nencini (1960), and Lucien Aimar (1966) had done so. He countered criticism that he had not shown enough fighting spirit by not taking an individual stage win, saying: "If I had worried about individual stage victories, it's possible I would have lost the Tour de France." Particular praise was given after the Tour to Miguel Induráin, who some, such as his biographer Alasdair Fotheringham, speculated could have challenged for the overall victory had he not worked for Delgado, in particular on the stage to Alpe d'Huez, where he lost 12 minutes.

Classification leadership and minor prizes

There were four main classifications in the 1990 Tour de France. The most important was the general classification, calculated by adding each cyclist's finishing times on each stage. The cyclist with the least accumulated time was the race leader, identified by the yellow jersey; the winner of this classification is considered the winner of the Tour. Time bonuses were distributed to the first three finishers of each stage that was not a mountain stage or a time trial. The winner received a 20-second time bonus, with 12 seconds for second and eight seconds for third place respectively. These bonuses were reduced to 12, 8, and 4 seconds on stage 1, since two stages were held on the same day. In addition, time bonuses could be won at intermediate sprints during the first half of the race. The first three riders across the line were granted a bonus of 6, 4, and 2 seconds respectively.

The points classification was calculated in another way: the first cyclists to finish in a stage received points, based on their rank and the type of stage. Flat stages awarded the winner 35 points, down to one point for 25th place. On medium mountain stages, 25 points were given to the winner, down to one point for 20th place. On a mountainous stage, the first rider across the finish received 20 points, down to one point for 15th place. In time trials, 15 points were given to the winner, down to one point for tenth place. All stages, except time trials, also had one or more intermediate sprints, where some points could be won. All road stages included two intermediate sprints, except for stage 5 with eight sprints. The first three riders across the intermediate sprint line received 6, 4, and 2 points respectively. The cyclist with the most points led the classification, and was identified with a green jersey. Olaf Ludwig won the classification with 256 points, 35 points ahead of Museeuw. The intermediate sprints classification, held until the year before, was abandoned for 1990.

Additionally, there was the mountains classification. The organisation ranked climbs by difficulty, with the hardest ascents rated hors catégorie and the easiest as fourth category. Points for this classification were won by the cyclists that reached the top of these climbs first. An hors catégorie climb gave the first rider across 40 points, down to one point for 15th place. First-category mountains awarded 30 points for the first rider, with second-, third-, and fourth-category giving out 20, 10, and 5 points respectively to the first across the summit. The cyclist with the most points led the classification, and wore a white jersey with red polka dots. Thierry Claveyrolat won the classification with 321 points, while Chiappucci placed second on 179 points.

There was also the young rider classification. This was decided the same way as the general classification, but only riders born after 1 January 1966 were eligible. Until 1988, the leader of this classification had worn a white jersey, while in 1989, the leader was highlighted by wearing the logo of the European Union on his shoulder. Both were not used in the 1990 Tour. Gilles Delion won the classification, finishing in 15th place on the general classification.

The 1989 Tour had included the combination classification, which was also no longer run. Both the intermediate sprint as well as the combination classification were scrapped to allow for more prize money to be paid out to the other classifications, a move instigated by new race director Jean-Marie Leblanc, who had taken over the position in late 1988. The 1990 Tour was the first run completely under his control.

For the team classification, the times of the best three cyclists per team on each stage were added; the leading team was the team with the lowest total time.

In addition, there was a combativity award given after each mass-start stage to the cyclist considered the most combative. The decision was made by a jury composed of journalists who gave points. The cyclist with the most points from votes in all stages led the combativity classification. Eduardo Chozas won this classification, and was given overall the super-combativity award. The Souvenir Henri Desgrange was given in honour of Tour founder Henri Desgrange to the first rider to pass the summit of the Col du Tourmalet on stage 16. This prize was won by Miguel Ángel Martínez Torres.

The Tour de France paid out F10,073,450 as prize money in total, two million of which went to the winner of the general classification (about $363,000 or £200,000 at the time). The prizes were mainly raised by the fees paid by departure and arrival cities along the course of the race. 550,000 francs had to be paid to host both the start and finish of a stage, with 300,000 francs asked for just one of the two. $75,000 each came from the entry fees paid by the teams to compete. Eventually,  received the biggest share of prize money, £248,480, ahead of 's £115,830. The overall budget of the Tour was around £10,000,000.

Final standings

General classification

Points classification

Mountains classification

Young rider classification

Team classification

Combativity classification

Doping and penalties
No rider tested positive for performance-enhancing drugs during doping tests at the 1990 Tour. Eric Vanderaerden was expelled from the race on stage 11 for repeatedly holding on to the doors of team cars during the ascent to Alpe d'Huez.

Notes

References

Bibliography

Further reading

External links
 

 
1990
1990 in road cycling
1990 in French sport
June 1990 sports events in Europe
July 1990 sports events in Europe